Why Are You Like This is an Australian television comedy series first screened on the ABC in 2018. It follows the adventures of best friends Penny and Mia and their housemate Austin, socially conscious twenty-somethings who navigate the uncertainties of emerging adulthood. The series was written by Naomi Higgins, Humyara Mahbub, and Mark Bonanno.

Production

First series
The series began as part of the comedy anthology series Fresh Blood which screened in 2018. It was one of four new comedies screened in the series, which were seen as potential pilots for a full TV series. In September 2019, the show was picked up to series by ABC. The series premiered on 16 February 2021 on ABC TV Plus, with a repeat on ABC TV the following night. The series is set in Melbourne. Its main characters are Extremely Online.

Cast
 Naomi Higgins as Penny
 Olivia Junkeer as Mia
 Wil King as Austin

References

External links
 Official website
 
 

Australian Broadcasting Corporation original programming
Australian comedy television series
2018 Australian television series debuts
2021 Australian television series debuts
English-language television shows